The mixed relay triathlon was part of the Triathlon at the 2018 Commonwealth Games program. The competition was held on 7 April 2018 in the Southport Broadwater Parklands.

Schedule
All times are Australian Eastern Standard Time (UTC+10)

Competition format
Each team consisted of four athletes (two male and two female) and each had to cover a course of  swimming,  road bicycling, and  road running.

Results

References

Triathlon at the 2018 Commonwealth Games
Triathlon 2018